Kent—Essex was a federal electoral district (riding) in Ontario, Canada, that was represented in the House of Commons of Canada from 1968 to 1979.

It was created in the redistribution of 1966 from parts of Essex South and Kent ridings.

It consisted of Point Pelee National Park and the Townships of Gosfield South, Mersea, Pelee and Gosfield North, excepting the Town of Essex in the County of Essex; and the City of Chatham, the Town of Tilbury and the Townships of Raleigh, Romney and Tilbury East in the County of Kent.

It was eliminated in the redistribution of 1976 when it was divided between Essex—Kent and Kent ridings.

Members of Parliament

This riding elected the following member of the Members of Parliament:

Election results

|-

See also 

 List of Canadian federal electoral districts
 Past Canadian electoral districts

External links
Federal riding history for Kent—Essex from the Library of Parliament

Former federal electoral districts of Ontario